Eva Logar (born 8 March 1991) is a retired Slovenian ski jumper.

Her biggest career result was fourth place individual in the 2011 World Championships in Oslo at normal hill.

She competed  at the 2014 Winter Olympics in Sochi, where she placed 27th in normal hill.

References

1991 births
Living people
Skiers from Ljubljana
Slovenian female ski jumpers
Olympic ski jumpers of Slovenia
Ski jumpers at the 2014 Winter Olympics
21st-century Slovenian women